Ambrose Gwinnett Bierce (June 24, 1842 – ) was an American short story writer, journalist, poet, and American Civil War veteran. His book The Devil's Dictionary was named as one of "The 100 Greatest Masterpieces of American Literature" by the American Revolution Bicentennial Administration.  His story "An Occurrence at Owl Creek Bridge" has been described as "one of the most famous and frequently anthologized stories in American literature", and his book Tales of Soldiers and Civilians (also published as In the Midst of Life) was named by the Grolier Club as one of the 100 most influential American books printed before 1900.

A prolific and versatile writer, Bierce was regarded as one of the most influential journalists in the United States, and as a pioneering writer of realist fiction. For his horror writing, Michael Dirda ranked him alongside Edgar Allan Poe and H. P. Lovecraft. S. T. Joshi speculates that he may well be the greatest satirist America has ever produced, and in this regard can take his place with such figures as Juvenal, Swift, and Voltaire. His war stories influenced Stephen Crane, Ernest Hemingway, and others, and he was considered an influential and feared literary critic. In recent decades Bierce has gained wider respect as a fabulist and for his poetry.

In 1913, Bierce told reporters that he was travelling to Mexico to gain first-hand experience of the Mexican Revolution. He disappeared and was never seen again.

Early life
Bierce was born in a log cabin at Horse Cave Creek in Meigs County, Ohio, on June 24, 1842, to Marcus Aurelius Bierce (1799–1876) and Laura Sherwood Bierce.  He was of entirely English ancestry: all of his forebears came to North America between 1620 and 1640 as part of the Great Puritan Migration.  He often wrote critically of both "Puritan values" and people who "made a fuss" about genealogy. He was the tenth of thirteen children,  all of whom were given names by their father beginning with the letter "A": in order of birth, the Bierce siblings were Abigail, Amelia, Ann, Addison, Aurelius, Augustus, Almeda, Andrew, Albert, Ambrose, Arthur, Adelia, and Aurelia. His mother was a descendant of William Bradford.

His parents were a poor but literary couple who instilled in him a deep love for books and writing. Bierce grew up in Kosciusko County, Indiana, attending high school at the county seat, Warsaw.

He left home at 15 to become a printer's devil at a small abolitionist newspaper, the Northern Indianan.

Military career
Bierce briefly attended the Kentucky Military Institute until it burned down. At the start of the American Civil War, he enlisted in the Union Army's 9th Indiana Infantry. He participated in the operations in Western Virginia (1861), was present at the Battle of Philippi (the first organized land action of the war) and received newspaper attention for his daring rescue, under fire, of a gravely wounded comrade at the Battle of Rich Mountain. Bierce fought at the Battle of Shiloh (April 1862), a terrifying experience that became a source for several short stories and the memoir "What I Saw of Shiloh".

In April 1863 he was commissioned a first lieutenant, and served on the staff of General William Babcock Hazen as a topographical engineer, making maps of likely battlefields. As a staff officer, Bierce became known to leading generals such as George H. Thomas and Oliver O. Howard, both of whom supported his application for admission to West Point in May 1864. General Hazen believed Bierce would graduate from the military academy "with distinction" and William T. Sherman also endorsed the application for admission, even though stating he had no personal acquaintance with Bierce. In June 1864, Bierce sustained a traumatic brain injury at the Battle of Kennesaw Mountain and spent the rest of the summer on furlough, returning to active duty in September. He was discharged from the army in January 1865.

His military career resumed in mid-1866, when he joined General Hazen as part of an expedition to inspect military outposts across the Great Plains. The expedition traveled by horseback and wagon from Omaha, Nebraska, arriving toward year's end in San Francisco, California.

Personal life

Bierce married Mary Ellen "Mollie" Day on December 25, 1871. They had three children: sons Day (1872–1889) and Leigh (1874–1901) and daughter Helen (1875–1940). Both of Bierce's sons died before he did. Day committed suicide after a romantic rejection (he non-fatally shot the woman of his affections along with her fiancé beforehand), and Leigh died of pneumonia related to alcoholism. Bierce separated from his wife in 1888, after discovering compromising letters to her from an admirer. They divorced in 1904. Mollie Day Bierce died the following year.

Bierce was an avowed agnostic and strongly rejected the divinity of Christ. He had lifelong asthma, as well as complications from his war wounds, most notably episodes of fainting and irritability assignable to the traumatic brain injury experienced at Kennesaw Mountain.

Journalism
In San Francisco, Bierce was awarded the rank of brevet major before resigning from the Army. He remained in San Francisco for many years, eventually becoming famous as a contributor or editor of newspapers and periodicals, including The San Francisco News Letter, The Argonaut, the Overland Monthly, The Californian and The Wasp. A selection of his crime reporting from The San Francisco News Letter was included in the Library of America anthology True Crime.

Bierce lived and wrote in England from 1872 to 1875, contributing to Fun magazine. His first book, The Fiend's Delight, a compilation of his articles, was published in London in 1873 by John Camden Hotten under the pseudonym "Dod Grile".

Returning to the United States, he again took up residence in San Francisco. From 1879 to 1880, he traveled to Rockerville and Deadwood in the Dakota Territory, to try his hand as local manager for a New York mining company. When the company failed he returned to San Francisco and resumed his career in journalism.

From January 1, 1881, until September 11, 1885, he was editor of The Wasp magazine, in which he began a column titled "Prattle". He also became one of the first regular columnists and editorialists on William Randolph Hearst's newspaper, The San Francisco Examiner, eventually becoming one of the most prominent and influential writers and journalists on the West Coast. He remained associated with Hearst Newspapers until 1909.

Railroad refinancing bill
The Union Pacific and Central Pacific railroad companies had received large, low-interest loans from the U.S. government to build the First transcontinental railroad. Central Pacific executive Collis P. Huntington persuaded a friendly member of Congress to introduce a bill excusing the companies from repaying the loans, amounting  to $130 million (worth $ today).

In January 1896 Hearst dispatched Bierce to Washington, D.C., to foil this attempt. The essence of the plot was secrecy; the railroads' advocates hoped to get the bill through Congress without any public notice or hearings. When the angered Huntington confronted Bierce on the steps of the Capitol and told Bierce to name his price, Bierce's answer ended up in newspapers nationwide: "My price is one hundred thirty million dollars. If, when you are ready to pay, I happen to be out of town, you may hand it over to my friend, the Treasurer of the United States."

Bierce's coverage and diatribes on the subject aroused such public wrath that the bill was defeated. Bierce returned to California in November.

McKinley accusation

Because of his penchant for biting social criticism and satire, Bierce's long newspaper career was controversial. On several occasions his columns stirred up a storm of hostile reaction, which created difficulties for Hearst. One of the most notable of these incidents occurred following the assassination of President William McKinley, when Hearst's opponents turned a poem Bierce had written about the assassination of Governor William Goebel of Kentucky in 1900 into a cause célèbre.

Bierce meant his poem to express a national mood of dismay and fear, but after McKinley was shot in 1901, it seemed to foreshadow the crime:

Hearst was thereby accused by rival newspapers—and by then-Secretary of War Elihu Root—of having called for McKinley's assassination. Despite a national uproar that ended his ambitions for the presidency (and even his membership in the Bohemian Club), Hearst kept employing Bierce.

Literary works

During his lifetime, Bierce was better known as a journalist than as a fiction writer.  His most popular stories were written in rapid succession between 1888 and 1891, in what was characterized as "a tremendous burst of consummate art". Bierce's works often highlight the inscrutability of the universe and the absurdity of death.

Bierce wrote realistically of the terrible things he had seen in the war in such stories as "An Occurrence at Owl Creek Bridge", "A Horseman in the Sky", "One of the Missing", and "Chickamauga". His grimly realistic cycle of 25 war stories has been called "the greatest anti-war document in American literature".

According to Milton Subotsky, Bierce helped pioneer the psychological horror story. In addition to his ghost and war stories, he also published several volumes of poetry.  His Fantastic Fables anticipated the ironic style of grotesquerie that became a more common genre in the 20th century.

One of Bierce's most famous works is his much-quoted The Devil's Dictionary, originally an occasional newspaper item, first published in book form in 1906 as The Cynic's Word Book. Described as "howlingly funny", it consists of satirical definitions of English words which lampoon cant and political double-talk. Bierce edited the twelve volumes of The Collected Works of Ambrose Bierce, which were published from 1909 to 1912. The seventh volume consists solely of The Devil's Dictionary.

Bierce has been criticized by his contemporaries and later scholars for deliberately pursuing improbability and for his penchant toward "trick endings". In his later stories, apparently under the influence of Maupassant, Bierce "dedicated himself to shocking the audience", as if his purpose was "to attack the reader's smug intellectual security".

Bierce's bias towards Naturalism has also been noted: "The biting, deriding quality of his satire, unbalanced by any compassion for his targets, was often taken as petty meanness, showing contempt for humanity and an intolerance to the point of merciless cruelty".

Stephen Crane was of the minority of Bierce's contemporaries who valued Bierce's experimental short stories.  In his essay "Supernatural Horror in Literature", H. P. Lovecraft characterized Bierce's fictional work as "grim and savage."  Lovecraft goes on to say that nearly all of Bierce's stories are of the horror genre and some shine as great examples of weird fiction.

Critic and novelist  William Dean Howells said, "Mr. Bierce is among our three greatest writers." When told this, Bierce responded, "I am sure Mr. Howells is the other two."

Disappearance
In October 1913, Bierce, then age 71, departed from Washington, D.C., for a tour of his old Civil War battlefields. According to some reports, by December he had passed through Louisiana and Texas, crossing by way of El Paso into Mexico, which was in the throes of revolution. In Ciudad Juárez he joined Pancho Villa's army as an observer, and in that role he witnessed the Battle of Tierra Blanca.

It was reported that Bierce accompanied Villa's army as far as the city of Chihuahua. His last known communication with the world was a letter he wrote there to Blanche Partington, a close friend, dated December 26, 1913. After closing this letter by saying, "As to me, I leave here tomorrow for an unknown destination," he vanished without a trace, his disappearance becoming one of the most famous in American literary history. 

Despite an abundance of theories, Bierce's ultimate fate remains a mystery. He wrote in one of his final letters: "Good-bye. If you hear of my being stood up against a Mexican stone wall and shot to rags, please know that I think it is a pretty good way to depart this life. It beats old age, disease, or falling down the cellar stairs. To be a Gringo in Mexico--ah, that is euthanasia!"

Skeptic Joe Nickell noted that the letter to Partington had not been found (all that existed was a notebook belonging to his secretary and companion, Carrie Christiansen), and concluded that Bierce deliberately concealed his true whereabouts when he finally went to a selected location in the Grand Canyon and committed suicide.

There was an official investigation by U.S. consular officials of the disappearance of one of its citizens. Some of Villa's men were questioned at the time of his disappearance and afterwards, with contradictory accounts.  Pancho Villa's representative in the U.S., Felix A. Sommerfeld, was contacted by U.S. chief of staff Hugh L. Scott and Sommerfeld investigated the disappearance.  Bierce was said to have been last seen in the city of Chihuahua in January.

Oral tradition in Sierra Mojada, Coahuila, documented by a priest, James Lienert, states that Bierce was executed by firing squad in the town cemetery there.

Legacy and influence

Bierce has been fictionalized in more than 50 novels, short stories, movies, television shows, stage plays, and comic books. Most of these works draw upon Bierce's vivid personality, colorful wit, relationships with famous people such as Jack London and William Randolph Hearst, or, quite frequently, his mysterious disappearance.

Bierce has been portrayed by such well-known authors as Ray Bradbury, Jack Finney, Carlos Fuentes, Winston Groom, Robert Heinlein, and Don Swaim. Some works featuring a fictional Ambrose Bierce have received favorable reviews, generated international sales, or earned major awards.

Bierce's short stories, "Haita the Shepherd" and "An Inhabitant of Carcosa" are believed to have influenced early weird-fiction writer Robert W. Chambers' tales of The King in Yellow (1895), which featured Hastur, Carcosa, Lake Hali and other names and locations initiated in these tales. Chambers in turn went on to influence H. P. Lovecraft and much of modern horror fiction.

In 1918, H. L. Mencken called Bierce "the one genuine wit that These States have ever seen."

At least three films have been made of Bierce's story "An Occurrence at Owl Creek Bridge". A silent film version, The Bridge, was made in 1929 by Charles Vidor. A French version called La Rivière du Hibou, directed by Robert Enrico, was released in 1962; this black-and-white film faithfully recounts the original narrative using voiceover. It aired in 1964 on American television as one of the final episodes of the television series The Twilight Zone: "An Occurrence at Owl Creek Bridge". Prior to The Twilight Zone, the story had been adapted as an episode of Alfred Hitchcock Presents. Another version, directed by Brian James Egen, was released in 2005. It was also adapted for the CBS radio programs Escape (1947), Suspense (1956, 1957, 1959), and Radio Mystery Theater (1974).

In his 1932 book Wild Talents, American writer and researcher into anomalous phenomena Charles Fort wrote about the unexplained disappearances of Ambrose Bierce and Ambrose Small, and asked, "Was somebody collecting Ambroses?"

Actor James Lanphier (1920–1969) played Bierce, with James Hampton as William Randolph Hearst, in the 1964 episode "The Paper Dynasty", of the syndicated western television series Death Valley Days, hosted by Stanley Andrews. In the story line, Hearst struggles to turn a profit despite increased circulation of The San Francisco Examiner. Robert O. Cornthwaite appears as Sam Chamberlain.

Carlos Fuentes's 1985 novel The Old Gringo is a fictionalized account of Bierce's disappearance; it was later adapted into the film Old Gringo (1989), starring Gregory Peck in the title role. Fuentes stated: "What started this novel was my admiration for Ambrose Bierce and for his Tales of Soldiers and Civilians."

Two adaptations were made of Bierce's story "Eyes of the Panther". One version was developed for Shelley Duvall's Nightmare Classics series and was released in 1990. It runs about 60 minutes. A shorter version was released in 2007 by director Michael Barton and runs about 23 minutes.

Bierce was a major character in a series of mystery books written by Oakley Hall and published between 1998 and 2006.

Biographer Richard O'Connor argued that, "War was the making of Bierce as a man and a writer... [he became] truly capable of transferring the bloody, headless bodies and boar-eaten corpses of the battlefield onto paper."

Essayist Clifton Fadiman wrote, "Bierce was never a great writer. He has painful faults of vulgarity and cheapness of imagination. But... his style, for one thing, will preserve him; and the purity of his misanthropy, too, will help to keep him alive."

Author Alan Gullette argues that Bierce's war tales may be the best writing on war, outranking his contemporary Stephen Crane (author of The Red Badge of Courage) and even Ernest Hemingway.

The short film "Ah! Silenciosa" (1999), starring Jim Beaver as Bierce, weaves elements of "An Occurrence at Owl Creek Bridge" into a speculation on Bierce's disappearance.

Bierce's disappearance and trip to Mexico provide the background for the vampire horror film From Dusk Till Dawn 3: The Hangman's Daughter (2000), in which Bierce's character plays a central role. Bierce's fate is the subject of Gerald Kersh's "The Oxoxoco Bottle" (aka "The Secret of the Bottle"), which appeared in The Saturday Evening Post on December 7, 1957, and was reprinted in the anthology Men Without Bones. Bierce reappears in the future on Mount Shasta in Robert Heinlein's novella, "Lost Legacy".

In the fall of 2001, An Occurrence Remembered, a theatrical retelling of Bierce's An Occurrence At Owl Creek Bridge and Chickamauga, premiered off-Broadway in New York City under the production and direction of Lorin Morgan-Richards and lead choreographer Nicole Cavaliere.

American composer Rodney Waschka II composed an opera, Saint Ambrose (2002), based on Bierce's life.

In 2002 the American Conservatory Theater in San Francisco premiered a one-act version of Bierce's ultra-short story "The Difficulty of Crossing a Field" by American composer David Lang.  The opera has since been performed by other companies.

In 2005, author Kurt Vonnegut stated that he considered "An Occurrence at Owl Creek Bridge" the "greatest American short story" and a work of "flawless... American genius".

"The Damned Thing" was adapted into a 2006 Masters of Horror episode of the same title directed by Tobe Hooper.

Don Swaim writes of Bierce's life and disappearance in The Assassination of Ambrose Bierce: A Love Story (2015).

Ambrose Bierce features as a character in Winston Groom's 2016 novel El Paso. In the novel, Bierce is personally executed by Pancho Villa.

Weird-fiction critic and editor S. T. Joshi has cited Bierce as an influence on his own work, and has praised him for his satirical wit, saying "Bierce will remain an equivocal figure in American and world literature chiefly because his dark view of humanity is, by its very nature, unpopular. Most people like writing that is cheerful and uplifting, even though a substantial proportion of the world's great literature is quite otherwise."

Works

Volumes published

Published during Bierce's lifetime
 The Fiend's Delight (as by "Dod Grile"). (London: John Camden Hotten, 1873). Stories, satire, journalism, poetry.
 Nuggets and Dust Panned Out in California (as by "Dod Grile"). (London: Chatto & Windus, 1873). Stories, satire, epigrams, journalism.
 Cobwebs from an Empty Skull (as by "Dod Grile"). (London and New York: George Routledge & Sons, 1874). Fables, stories, journalism.
 (with Thomas A. Harcourt) The Dance of Death (as by "William Herman"). (San Francisco: H. Keller & Co., 1877). Satire.
 Map of the Black Hills Region, Showing the Gold Mining District and the Seat of the Indian War (San Francisco: A. L. Bancroft & Co., 1877). Nonfiction: map.
 Tales of Soldiers and Civilians (San Francisco: E. L. G. Steele, 1891; many subsequent editions, some under the title In the Midst of Life). Fiction: stories.
 (with G. A. Danziger) The Monk and the Hangman's Daughter (Chicago: F.J. Schulte & Co., 1892). Fiction: novel (translation of Der Mönch von Berchtesgaden by Richard Voss).
 Black Beetles in Amber (San Francisco and New York: Western Authors Publishing, 1892). Poetry.
 Can Such Things Be?  (New York: Cassell, 1893). Fiction: stories.
 How Blind Is He  (San Francisco: F. Soulé Campbell, c. 1896). Poetry.
 Fantastic Fables (New York and London: G. P. Putnam's Sons, 1899). Fiction: fables.
 Shapes of Clay (San Francisco: W. E. Wood George Sterling, 1903). Poetry.
 The Cynic's Word Book  (New York: Doubleday, Page & Co., 1906). Satire.
 A Son of the Gods and A Horseman in the Sky  (San Francisco: Paul Elder, 1907). Fiction: stories.
 Write It Right: A Little Blacklist of Literary Faults (New York and Washington, D.C.: Neale Publishing, 1909). Nonfiction: precise use of words.
 The Shadow on the Dial and Other Essays S. O. Howes, ed. (San Francisco: A.M. Robertson, 1909). Collected journalism.
 The Collected Works of Ambrose Bierce (New York and Washington, DC: Neale Publishing, 1909–1912):
 Volume I: Ashes of the Beacon
 Volume II: In the Midst of Life: Tales of Soldiers and Civilians
 Volume III: Can Such Things Be?
 Volume IV: Shapes of Clay
 Volume V: Black Beetles in Amber
 Volume VI: The Monk and the Hangman's Daughter; Fantastic Fables
 Volume VII: The Devil's Dictionary
 Volume VIII: Negligible Tales; On with the Dance; Epigrams
 Volume IX: Tangential Views
 Volume X: The Opinionator
 Volume XI: Antepenultimata
 Volume XII: In Motley

Published posthumously

Fiction
 My Favorite Murder (New York: Curtis J. Kirch, 1916)
 A Horseman in the Sky: A Watcher by the Dead: The Man and the Snake (San Francisco: Book Club of California, 1920)
 Ten Tales (London: First Edition Club, 1925)
 Fantastic Debunking Fables (Girard, KS: Haldeman-Julius, 1926)
  An Occurrence at Owl Creek Bridge and Other Stories (Girard, KS: Haldeman-Julius, c. 1926)
 The Horseman in the Sky and Other Stories (Girard, KS: Haldeman-Julius, c. 1926)
 Tales of Ghouls and Ghosts (Girard, KS: Haldeman-Julius, c. 1927)
 Tales of Haunted Houses (Girard, KS: Haldeman-Julius, c. 1927)
 My Favorite Murder and Other Stories (Girard, KS: Haldeman-Julius, c. 1927)
 Ghost and Horror Stories, E. F. Bleiler, ed. (New York: Dover, 1964)
 The Complete Short Stories of Ambrose Bierce, Ernest Jerome Hopkins, ed. (Garden City, NY: Doubleday, 1970)
 The Stories and Fables of Ambrose Bierce, Edward Wagenknecht, ed. (Owings Mills, MD: Stemmer House, 1977)
 For the Ahkoond (West Warwick, RI: Necromomicon Press, 1980)
  A Horseman in the Sky  (Skokie, IL: Black Cat Press, 1983)
  One Summer Night
  One of the Missing: Tales of the War Between the States (Covelo, CA: Yolla Bolly Press, 1991)
 Civil War Stories (New York: Dover, 1994)
  An Occurrence at Owl Creek Bridge and Other Stories (London: Penguin, 1995)
 The Moonlit Road and Other Ghost and Horror Stories (Mineola, NY: Dover, 1998)
 A Deoderizer of Dead Dogs, Carl Japikse, ed. (Alpharetta, GA: Enthea Press, 1998)
 The Collected Fables of Ambrose Bierce, S. T. Joshi, ed. (Columbus: Ohio State University Press, 2000)
 The Short Fiction of Ambrose Bierce: A Comprehensive Edition (3 vols.), S. T. Joshi, Lawrence I. Berkove, and David E. Schultz, eds. (Knoxville: University of Tennessee, 2006)
 Ambrose Bierce: Masters of the Weird Tale, S. T. Joshi, ed. (Lakewood, CO: Centipede Press, 2013)
Satire
 Extraordinary Opinions on Commonplace Subjects (Girard, KS: Haldeman-Julius, c. 1927)
 A Cynic Looks at Life (Girard, KS: Haldeman-Julius, c. 1927)
 The Sardonic Humor of Ambrose Bierce,  George Barkin, ed. (New York: Dover, 1963)
 The Fall of the Republic and Other Political Satires, S. T. Joshi and David E. Schultz, eds. (Knoxville: University of Tennessee, 2000)

Poetry
 An Invocation (San Francisco: John Henry Nash/Book Club of California, 1928)
 The Lion and the Lamb (Berkeley: Archetype Press, 1939)
  A Vision of Doom: Poems by Ambrose Bierce , Donald Sidney-Fryer, ed. (West Kingston, RI: Donald M. Grant, Publisher 1980)
 Poems of Ambrose Bierce, M. E. Grenander, ed. (Lincoln: University of Nebraska, 1995)

Journalism
 Selections from Prattle, Carroll D. Hall, ed. (San Francisco: Book Club of California, 1936)
 The Ambrose Bierce Satanic Reader, Ernest Jerome Hopkins, ed. (Garden City, NY: Doubleday, 1968)
 Skepticism and Dissent: Selected Journalism from 1898 to 1901, Lawrence I. Berkove, ed. (Ann Arbor: Delmas, 1980)

Autobiography
 Iconoclastic Memories of the Civil War: Bits of Autobiography (Girard, KS: Haldeman-Julius, c. 1927)
 Battle Sketches (London: First Editions Club, 1930)
 A Sole Survivor: Bits of Autobiography, S. T. Joshi and David E. Schultz, eds. (Knoxville: University of Tennessee, 1998)

Collections of mixed types of content
 The Collected Writings of Ambrose Bierce (New York: Citadel Press, 1946)
 Ambrose Bierce's Civil War, William McCann, ed. (Chicago: Gateway Editions, 1956)
 The Devil's Advocate: An Ambrose Bierce Reader, Brian St. Pierre, ed. (San Francisco: Chronicle Books, 1987)
  An Occurrence at Owl Creek Bridge and Selected Works (Des Moines: Perfection Form Co., 1991)
 Shadows of Blue and Gray: The Civil War Writings of Ambrose Bierce, Brian M. Thomsen, ed. (New York: Forge, 2002)
 Phantoms of a Blood-Stained Period: The Complete Civil War Writings of Ambrose Bierce, Russell Duncan and David J. Klooster, eds. (Amherst: University of Massachusetts, 2002)
 Ambrose Bierce: The Devil's Dictionary, Tales, and Memoirs, S. T. Joshi, ed. (Boone, IA: Library of America, 2011)
 Collected Essays and Journalism: Volume 1: 1867–1869, David E. Schultz and S. T. Joshi, eds. (Seattle: Sarnath Press, 2022)
 Collected Essays and Journalism: Volume 2: 1869–1870, David E. Schultz and S. T. Joshi, eds. (Seattle: Sarnath Press, 2022)
 Collected Essays and Journalism: Volume 3: 1870–1871, David E. Schultz and S. T. Joshi, eds. (Seattle: Sarnath Press, 2022)
 Collected Essays and Journalism: Volume 4: 1871–1872, David E. Schultz and S. T. Joshi, eds. (Seattle: Sarnath Press, 2022)
 Collected Essays and Journalism: Volume 5: 1872–1873, David E. Schultz and S. T. Joshi, eds. (Seattle: Sarnath Press, 2022)
 Collected Essays and Journalism: Volume 6: 1873–1874, David E. Schultz and S. T. Joshi, eds. (Seattle: Sarnath Press, 2023)

Letters
 Containing Four Ambrose Bierce Letters (New York: Charles Romm, 1921)
 The Letters of Ambrose Bierce, Bertha Clark Pope [and George Sterling, uncredited], eds. (San Francisco: Book Club of California, 1922)
 Twenty-one Letters of Ambrose Bierce, Samuel Loveman, ed. (Cleveland: George Kirk, 1922)
 A Letter and a Likeness (n.p.: Harvey Taylor, [1930?])
 Battlefields and Ghosts (Palo Alto: Harvest Press, 1931)
 Ambrose Bierce: "My Dear Rearden": a Letter. (Berkeley: Bancroft Library Press, 1997)
 A Much Misunderstood Man: Selected Letters of Ambrose Bierce, S. T. Joshi and David E. Schultz, eds. (Columbus: Ohio State University, 2003)
 My Dear Mac: Three Letters (Berkeley: Bancroft Library Press, 2006)

Short stories

Ambrose Bierce was a prolific writer of short fiction. He wrote 249 short stories, 846 fables, and more than 300 humorous Little Johnny stories. The following list provides links to more information about notable stories by Bierce.

War stories
 Killed at Resaca (1887)
 One of the Missing (1888)
 A Tough Tussle (1888)
 A Horseman in the Sky (1889)
 An Occurrence at Owl Creek Bridge (1890)

Supernatural stories
 A Psychological Shipwreck (1879)
 An Inhabitant of Carcosa (1886)
 An Unfinished Race (1888)
 One of Twins (1888)
 The Spook House (1889)

 The Man and the Snake (1890)
 The Realm of the Unreal (1890)
 The Middle Toe of the Right Foot (1890)
 The Boarded Window (1891)
 The Death of Halpin Frayser (1891)
 The Secret of Macarger's Gulch (1891)
 John Bartine's Watch (1893)
 The Eyes of the Panther (1897)
 The Moonlit Road (1907)
 Beyond the Wall (1907)

Science fiction
 The Damned Thing (1893)
 Moxon's Master (1899)

See also

 List of horror fiction authors
 List of people who disappeared
 List of authors in war
 List of American print journalists
 List of short-story authors
 List of satirists and satires
 Fable
 The Devil's Dictionary
 Tales of Soldiers and Civilians
 "An Occurrence at Owl Creek Bridge"

References

Bibliography 
 
 Cozzens, Peter. 1996. "The Tormenting Flame: What Ambrose Bierce Saw in a Fire-Swept Thicket at Shiloh Haunted Him for the rest of his Life." Civil War Times Illustrated. April 1996. Volume XXXV (1). pp. 44–54.
 De Castro, Adolphe (1929). Portrait of Ambrose Bierce (New York and London: Century).
 Eckhardt, Jason. "Across the Borderlands of Conjecture with Mr Bierce." Studies in Weird Fiction 4 (Fall 1988), 26–31.
 Fatout, Paul. Ambrose Bierce: The Devil's Lexicographer. Norman: University of Oklahoma Press, 1951.
 
 Grenander, M.E. Ambrose Bierce. NY: Twayne Publishers, 1971.
 McWilliams, Carey (1929; reprinted 1967). Ambrose Bierce: A Biography, Archon Books.
 
 
 O'Connor, Richard (1967). Ambrose Bierce: a Biography, with illustrations, Boston, Little, Brown and Company.

Primary sources 
 Bierce, Ambrose. (2010) The Collected Works of Ambrose Bierce (3 vol 1910) online
 Bierce, Ambrose. The Civil War Short Stories of Ambrose Bierce (U of Nebraska Press, 1988). online
 
 Bierce, Ambrose. The complete short stories of Ambrose Bierce (1970[ reprint U of Nebraska Press, 1984). online
 The Ambrose Bierce Papers, 1872–1913 (2 linear ft.) and Foster family collection of Ambrose Bierce materials (3 linear feet) are housed in the Department of Special Collections and University Archives at Stanford University Libraries.
 The Ambrose Bierce Papers, ca. 1894–1913 and the Collection of Ambrose Bierce Papers, 1875–1925, bulk 1890–1913 are housed at The Bancroft Library.

External links

 
 
 
 
 
 
 The Ambrose Bierce Site
 The Ambrose Bierce Project 
 Ambrose Bierce at PoetryFoundation.org
 One of Bierce's last letters
 Collected journalism of Ambrose Bierce at the Archive of American Journalism

1842 births
1910s deaths
1910s missing person cases
19th-century American short story writers
20th-century American non-fiction writers
20th-century American short story writers
American abolitionists
American agnostics
American columnists
American horror writers
American male poets
American satirists
Aphorists
Writers from Indiana
Comedians from Ohio
Fabulists
Ghost story writers
Hearst Communications people
Journalists from Ohio
Missing person cases in Mexico
People declared dead in absentia
People from Meigs County, Ohio
People of Indiana in the American Civil War
People of the Mexican Revolution
San Francisco Examiner people
Union Army officers
Weird fiction writers
Writers from Ohio
Writers from San Francisco
People from Kosciusko County, Indiana
Comedians from California
20th-century American comedians
American atheists